MV Astoria is a ship that was constructed as the transatlantic ocean liner Stockholm for Swedish American Line, and rebuilt as a cruise ship in 1993. Ordered in 1944, and commenced service in 1948, at 73 years old, she is the oldest passenger liner still sailing in deep water routes. As Stockholm, she was best known for an accidental collision with Andrea Doria in July 1956, resulting in the sinking of the latter ship and 46 fatalities off the coast of Nantucket, Massachusetts, United States.

During her seven decades of service she has passed through several owners and sailed under the names Stockholm, Völkerfreundschaft, Volker, Fridtjof Nansen, Italia I, Italia Prima, Valtur Prima, Caribe, Athena, and Azores before beginning service as Astoria in March 2016. Astoria sailed with Cruise & Maritime Voyages until 2020 when the company suspended operations due to the COVID-19 pandemic and she was subsequently sold again.

MS Stockholm

The ship was ordered in 1944, and launched 9 September 1946, as Stockholm by Götaverken in Gothenburg for the Swedish America Line (SAL). The ship was designed by Swedish American Line designer, Eric Christiansson, who worked as the technical director at parent company Broström. She was the fourth ship named Stockholm for Swedish American Line, but the second of the four to actually sail under the name (See: MS Stockholm (1941)). When Stockholm III was sold to the Italians, the proceeds were initially left aside, but were later used to finance the construction of the ship after the 1941 Stockholm was sunk during the war.

At  with a gross register tonnage of 12,165, Stockholm at the time was the smallest passenger ship operating on the North Atlantic route, but the largest passenger ship built in Sweden, with the largest diesel propulsion unit yet built in Sweden. Originally designed to carry a total of 395 passengers, divided between first and tourist class, and a cargo capacity of 3,000 tons. Interiors were completed by Swedish artists, including Kurt Jungstedt. When delivered, the ship would replace the aging SS Drottningholm, and run an alternating transatlantic service with MS Gripsholm. She made her maiden voyage on February 21, 1948, under the command of Captain Waldemar Jonsson, from Gothenburg arriving in New York on March 1.
The Stockholm would continue to sail the transatlantic route, later joined by the new MS Kungsholm (1952). A 1953 refit expanded Stockholm's capacity to 548 people by infilling the outdoor aft and forward end of "A" Deck with passenger cabins. Due to the small size, and not handling the North Atlantic seas very well during the colder months, the Swedish American Line scheduled her for occasional cruises starting in 1953 out of Morehead City, North Carolina cruising to Havana, Nassau, and Bermuda. In February 1955, she was used to deport Arne Pettersen, the last person to go through Ellis Island, to Gothenburg, Sweden. A later refit in 1956/57 added a cinema to the deck forward end of the main superstructure, and an outdoor pool aft.

With both MS Kungsholm and the new MS Gripsholm (1957) sailing, the smaller Stockholm was started to be seen as too small and not meeting the current standards of the line. The ship was sold in May 1959 to, at the time, an unidentified German company. The ship would finish out the year sailing with Swedish American Line to New York, before being transferred in 1960 to the new company.

Collision with Andrea Doria 

On the night of July 25, 1956, at 11:10 pm, in heavy fog in the North Atlantic Ocean off the coast of Nantucket, Stockholm and Andrea Doria of the Italian Line collided in what was to become one of history's most notorious maritime disasters.

Although most passengers and crew survived the collision, the larger Andrea Doria luxury liner capsized and sank the following morning. Owing to the collision, 50% of Andrea Doria lifeboats were unusable. However, a number of ships, including SS Ile de France, responded and provided assistance, which averted a massive loss of life.

Five members of Stockholms crew were killed instantly, and several more were trapped in the wrecked bow. After the ships had separated, and as Stockholm crew members were beginning to survey the damage, one of the crew came across Linda Morgan, who had been thrown from her bed on Andrea Doria as the two ships collided and landed on Stockholms deck, suffering moderate but not life-threatening injuries.

After Andrea Doria sank, Stockholm sailed to New York City under her own power and arrived on July 27. There, the crushed bow portion was replaced at a cost of US$1 million three months later at Bethlehem Shipyard in Brooklyn, New York. An inquiry followed the events, with a settlement reached after 6 months between the Italian Line and Swedish American Line.

Wreckage from collision

Ship's bell 

Years following the collision, Andrea Doria became a popular dive site. In 1959, Stockholms damaged ship's bell was recovered from the wreck site. Today it is displayed onboard in the ship's lobby.

Discovery of the bow wreckage 
In September 2020, New Jersey-based Atlantic Wreck Salvage announced that their ship, D/V Tenacious, had discovered Stockholms bow and anchors. The divers made the confirmation based on the presence and unique style of both anchors, internal bow reinforcements, accordion-style crumpling on the wreckage in the same pattern as seen in photos of Stockholm after the collision, and the location of the wreckage near Andrea Dorias final resting place.

East German ship Völkerfreundschaft 

On 3 January 1960, Stockholm was transferred to the East German government, which renamed the ship Völkerfreundschaft ("friendship between nations") operating under the line Deutsche Seereederei (German Shipping Company), a precursor of Aida Cruises.

Völkerfreundschaft made her new maiden voyage on February 23, 1960, and was home-ported in Rostock, Germany, eventually operating in tandem with the newly built Fritz Heckert. When the Berlin wall went up in 1961, all ports were restricted to communist countries only, which greatly limited sailing routes. The ship made trips to Cuba, and would be one of the two ships that was en route to Havana during the Cuban Missile Crisis, where she was suspiciously watched by US military planes and vessels. The ship was already halfway to Havana, and it was necessary to continue to resupply and refuel, before quickly turning around back to East Germany.

In 1964 the ship was put under the management of the Free German Trade Union Federation, but would be chartered out to western European countries for a majority of the year. This would be expanded in 1967, with Stena Line chartering the ship for Swedish passengers for half of the year, doing within annually until the ship was sold in 1985.

Norwegian barracks ship Fridtjof Nansen 
In 1985 she was transferred to a Panamanian company, Neptunas Rex Enterprises. Her name was reduced to Volker, and by the end of the year she was laid up in Southampton, England. In 1985 the ship was renamed Fridtjof Nansen was later used as a barracks ship in Oslo for asylum seekers in Norway.

Rebuilding into a modern cruise ship 

In 1989, ex-Stockholm was officially sold to the Italian Star Lauro Lines, who intended to convert the liner into a luxury cruise ship. The ship was still under charter as the Fridtjof Nansen, and so remained in Oslo until 1993. The ship was towed to a shipyard in Genoa, Italy, Andrea Doria home port; but when she arrived, the press labeled her "the ship of death" (La nave della morte) due to the collision with Andrea Doria. During conversion, it was discovered that the ex-Stockholm was in very good condition (except for the American-built replacement bow, which needed the most refurbishing). 

She was completely gutted on the interior, and rebuilt from the promenade deck up. New diesel engines were installed, and a new bridge was built, extending the superstructure forward. The aft decks were built up, giving her a more modern cruise ship profile. A large ducktail was added that significantly altered the stern appearance. Although not very recognizable from her original appearance as Stockholm; many elements such as the bow and anchor, hull window arrangement, passenger lifts and stair locations, and the distinct double porthole dining room windows, were all visible traits from the original Stockholm design.

Cruise ship

Italia I - Italia Prima - Valtur Prima 

Following the completion of the refit in 1994, ship was named Italia I, then Italia Prima, she later sailed as Valtur Prima primarily to Cuba, and was laid up there in 2001.

Caribe 
Acquired by Festival Cruises in 2002 and renamed Caribe, she continued to sail to Cuba.

Athena 
In 2005 the Caribe was renamed Athena, being registered in Portugal. She was reflagged to Cyprus operating for Classic International Cruises.

Pirate attack 
On December 3, 2008 Athena was attacked by pirates in the Gulf of Aden. Reportedly, 29 pirate boats surrounded the ship at one stage until a US Navy P-3 Orion maritime patrol aircraft circled above which caused some of the pirates to flee. The crew prevented the pirates from boarding by firing high-pressure water cannons at them. No one was injured and the ship escaped without damage, continuing her voyage to Australia.

In 2009 the ship was chartered to German cruise operator Phoenix Reisen and repainted in the company colors with a turquoise funnel and company logo. On September 17, 2012, reports announced that she and her fellow ship Princess Danae were detained in Marseille, France, for unpaid fuel bills.

Azores 
Early in 2013 Athena was bought by the recently created Portuguese cruise company Portuscale Cruises and renamed Azores. As soon as her acquisition was confirmed, she was taken to a shipyard in Marseille, where she was revamped. She then entered Portuscale Cruises service after completing a charter for Berlin-based Ambiente Kreuzfahrten, from whom she was chartered to Classic International to join her fleetmate Princess Daphne. 

The charter began in March 2014 with a cruise from Lisbon, Portugal, to Bremerhaven, Germany, and concluded in November 2014 in Genoa, Italy. After Portuscale's collapse, the administrator of the ship's formal owner, Island Cruises — Transportes Marítimos, Unipessoal Ltda., secured a charter to Cruise & Maritime Voyages (CMV). Her first voyage was from Avonmouth Docks to the Caribbean in January 2015.

Astoria 

In March 2016 the ship was renamed Astoria by Cruise & Maritime Voyages and from May 2016 until March 2017 was subchartered to French tour operator Rivages du Monde. Since 2016, Astoria is the last remaining vessel of the former Swedish American Line still afloat, after the former Kungsholm was scrapped in 2016.

In June 2016, it was announced that Astoria would be leaving the CMV fleet after her final cruise on April 27, 2017 from London Tilbury. In February 2017, CMV announced that Astoria would remain in the CMV fleet until 2018. She would offer a mini-season from London Tilbury, before being charted by Rivages du Monde during the summer months.

Astoria was scheduled to begin winter cruising the Sea of Cortez from the port of Puerto Peñasco (Rocky Point) Mexico from December 2019, but this sailing did not take place until January 2020 due to unspecified delays in dry dock. The 2020 cruise season was intended be the last for Astoria in the CMV fleet.

The vessel was arrested by UK Maritime & Coastguard Agency officers in June 2020 following reports she was about to set sail and leave UK jurisdiction without arranging the repatriation of foreign crew members stranded in the UK by the COVID-19 pandemic. CMV entered administration in 2020. Astoria was later moved to Rotterdam and put up for auction on 1 March 2021, with a minimum sale price of €10 million, but received no offers until July 2021. The ship remained in custody pending decisions by owners and creditors.

2021 sale 
In July 2021, the ship was purchased by The Roundtable LLC, a Puerto Rico-based affiliate of Brock Pierce, who also acquired Funchal. The new owner intended to return Astoria to service, and convert Funchal to a hotelship. In March 2022 those plans were abandoned and the ship was again made available for sale, never having left port in Rotterdam. After rumours of a scrap sale, Astorias owner confirmed in January 2023 that it was still attempting to make a sale for continued trading.

See also 
 , served for 68 years
 , served for 75 years

References

External links 

Film: MS Stockholm Maiden Voyage
Tribute to Swedish American Line
ssMaritime: MS Stockholm Ship History

Maritime accidents involving fog
Ocean liners
Cruise ships of Portugal
Maritime incidents in 1956
Piracy in Somalia
1946 ships
Ships built in Gothenburg
Merchant ships of Sweden
Passenger ships of Sweden
Merchant ships of East Germany
Passenger ships of East Germany
Merchant ships of Panama
Passenger ships of Panama
Merchant ships of Italy
Passenger ships of Italy
Merchant ships of Portugal
Passenger ships of Portugal
Maritime incidents in the United States
Ships of Swedish American Line